The Click is the second studio album by American pop band AJR. It was released on June 9, 2017, by the band's label AJR Productions. The album was preceded by the five-track extended play What Everyone's Thinking in September 2016, which was composed of songs that all appear on The Click.

Singles 
The album has spawned four singles and two promotional singles. "Call My Dad" was released as the first promotional single in late 2015, "I'm Not Famous" was released as the second promotional single in April 2016, "Weak" was released as the first official single on September 20, 2016, "Drama" was released as the second single on May 11, 2017, and "Sober Up", which features Rivers Cuomo of Weezer was sent to contemporary hit radio on March 20, 2018 as the album's third single.  In late October 2021, “The Good Part” went viral on TikTok, which led to the song being released to US radio in late 2021, after the release of the trio's album OK Orchestra. A music video for the song was released on November 24, 2021.

Commercial performance
The Click debuted at number 61 on the US Billboard 200 chart, becoming the group's first appearance on the chart. As of May 2019, the album has earned 590,000 album-equivalent units in the United States. The album has also accumulated a total of 631.1 million on-demand audio streams for its tracks.

Critical response
The album received mixed reviews. Despite this, Atticus Dewey for The Communicator said the album is a "delight to listen to." He praised the opening track "Overture" because it showcases what the album will look like. He also praised the track "Bud Like You" because it "sounds like a campfire song with the addition of EDM beats. Another reason I love this song is that it uses a technique that the band calls 'Spokestep,' which is when they cut up the vocals over the beat of the song, the same way dubstep cuts up the bass over the song. This song is a relatable, catchy, and all around fun song to have going through your headphones."

Track listing

Personnel 
Credits adapted from the album's liner notes.

 AJR – audio mixing , production, songwriting 
 Chris Gehringer – audio mastering
 Alba Avoricani – guest vocal 
 Joe Zook – audio mixing 
 Rivers Cuomo – guest vocal, songwriting 
 Tony Maserati – audio mixing 
 Alicia Svigals – violin 
 Jake Kenowitz – trumpet 
 Delbert Bowers – audio mixing 
 Samia Finnerty – guest vocal 
 John Loren – album artwork
 Chris Cerrato – album design

Charts

Certifications

References 

2017 albums
AJR (band) albums
Black Butter Records albums
Ultra Records albums